Ethnic clashes in southern Kyrgyzstan may refer to:
 Osh riots, inter-ethnic clashes that took place between Kyrgyz and Uzbeks in Southern Kyrgyzstan in 1990;
 June pogroms, inter-ethnic clashes that took place between Kyrgyz and Uzbeks in Southern Kyrgyzstan in 2010